Vincent Welch (born August 4, 1964) is an American radio and television personality most recently for Fox Sports. Until 2022, Welch was the play-by-play commentator for NASCAR Camping World Truck Series, and occasionally, a pit reporter for FOX's coverage for the NASCAR Cup Series and NASCAR Xfinity Series. He also does commentary for games for Fox College Hoops.

Career 
After graduating from Ball State University in 1987, Welch would get an entry-level job in a small radio station in Richmond, Indiana, WKBV. With WKBV, he would do play-by-play commentary for the local high school teams in the area. After three and a half years with the company, he would leave for a part-time job with WISH-TV, and worked his way up into television.

In 1992, Welch would earn a regional Emmy Award for sports programming.

In 1995, he would move to WNDY-TV, and was named the sports chief of the station.

In 1998, Welch would move to WIBC, after he felt that he would be let go from WNDY-TV, as another company, Paramount Stations Group, had purchased the station and were letting go staff members. Welch was named sports director for WIBC, taking over for Bob Lamey.

Working for ESPN for various motor sports leagues, he would work as a pit reporter. In 2010, Welch was announced as the lead commentator for ESPN2's NASCAR Nationwide Series coverage. 

On January 2, 2023, Welch announced he will not return to Fox Sports for the 2023 season.

Personal life 
Vince graduated from Ball State University in 1987 with a degree in telecommunications. His son, Dillon Welch, was a radio personality for the Motor Racing Network. In 2020, it was announced that Welch had signed an endorsement deal with health and wellness multilevel marketing company Zurvita.

References 

1964 births
Living people
College football announcers
Television anchors from Indianapolis
Motorsport announcers
College basketball announcers in the United States
American radio sports announcers
American television sports announcers
Ball State University alumni